The Canadian Journalism Project (CJP) and its websites, J-Source.ca (English) and ProjetJ.ca (French), are published by a venture among post-secondary journalism schools and programs across Canada. The CJP is led by Toronto Metropolitan University, Université Laval and Carleton University and supported by a group of donors.

Launched in the spring of 2007 with the support of The Canadian Journalism Foundation, the site provides a source for news, research, commentary, advice, discussion, and resources for industry professionals, scholars, and students.

J-Source and ProjetJ
J-Source is the English website of the Canadian Journalism Project, and ProjetJ is the French website. They are both community-based sites for journalists, journalism students, journalism educators and members of the public who are interested in journalism issues in Canada. Each site's content is maintained by an English Masthead and French Masthead, respectively (i.e. the French site is not a direct translation of the English site). The content of the sites is divided into categories, which are each edited and maintained by a member of the respective masthead.

Governance
The CJP is governed by two committees: an Editorial Committee and a Management Committee. Specific duties and responsibilities may be delegated to sub-committees as necessary.

Administration
The editor-in-chief is Wilfrid Laurier University Bruce Gillespie, with Tamara Baluja, as associate editor. There are editors based on topics such as work and labour, education, book reviews, law, journalism, and photo journalism.

French Masthead
The French Masthead manages content on the French site.

Current Members
Hélène Roulot-Ganzmann—Editor-in-Chief, ProjetJ
Colette Brin, Université Laval—Formation
Chantal Francoeur, UQAM—Lectures
Marc-François Bernier, Université d'Ottawa—Éthique et déontologie
Pierre Duchesne, Radio-Canada
Annie Labrecque, Les Débrouillards
Michel Munger, Canal Argent
Arnaud Carbasse, UQAM-GRICIS

Management Committee  
The management committee of J-Source was suspended when the Canadian Journalism Foundation ended its responsibility for J-Source, which is now a cooperative of various journalism schools and organizations. The publisher of J-Source calls together contributing members of the cooperative to determine policy and make financial decisions.

The original terms of the Management Committee were:
Developing governance structure and policies with the Mastheads
Hiring and overseeing staff (consulting with editors-in-chief)
Budgeting and managing expenses
Strategic planning and direction
Marketing and promotion
Fundraising

References

External links 
 J-Source
 ProjetJ

Canadian journalism organizations